Degrassi Goes Hollywood is a 2009 Canadian film adaptation of the popular, long-running teenage drama Degrassi: The Next Generation. The movie premiered in the United States on The N on 14 August 2009, and in Canada on CTV on 30 August 2009. It was directed by veteran Degrassi actor-director, Stefan Brogren. Degrassi Goes Hollywood is the first feature-length movie of the Next Generation cast, and the second feature-length film in the Degrassi franchise, the first being 1992's School's Out in which Brogren co-starred. Degrassi Goes Hollywood is the first in-continuity Degrassi production recorded and set principally outside of Canada. For syndication purposes, the film has been shown as a four-part episode titled "Paradise City".

An extended version of the film was released as a bonus on the show's season 8 DVD on 1 September 2009.

Plot 
Jason Mewes is the writer/director of Mewesical High, an upcoming musical about his high school relationship with his girlfriend Trixie. With the help of Kevin Smith, Mewes holds auditions for Trixie's role at the university of Manny and Emma. Unfortunately, Manny's audition tape is a disaster and she does not get a callback. Manny, encouraged by Kevin Smith to audition for the role again, decides to join a road trip to Los Angeles with Stüdz band members Sav, Peter, and Danny, led by Jay, who has borrowed a Degrassi school bus as travel. Mia rides along to spend time with her boyfriend Peter. Manny is still insecure about her acting and singing abilities due to her abusive relationship with her professor Mick, but she regains her confidence with Jay's help.

Meanwhile, in LA, Paige is working as a lowly assistant for reality show diva Hailey Montel. Hailey has Paige perform menial tasks such as taking care of her dog Truffles. Paige is recruited for the lead role by Mewesical High executive producer Robbie and furnished with a personal limousine and a gorgeous mansion. After vowing not to inherit Hailey's vain attitude, Paige quits her assistant job and invites Ellie and Marco from Toronto to celebrate with her. Ellie, trying to ignore the news that her father is returning from a military tour in Afghanistan, agrees to go to LA.

Filming is not going well with Paige as she frequently butts heads with Mewes on Trixie's character. Mewes wants to fire Paige, but Robbie demands she stays. Trying to get better acquainted with the Hollywood lifestyle, Paige seeks Hailey's advice. Hailey pushes Paige to improvise her lines and assert herself, alienating Marco and gaining a reputation as a diva among the Hollywood scene. Mewes is eventually fed up with Paige's antics and fires her. Manny is reinvigorated after getting the news of Paige's open position, but stalls to arrive after the gang's bus is stolen and broken down. Robbie, bluffing to keep Paige's job, threatens to fire Mewes, but Mewes suddenly quits, putting the musical in jeopardy.

Marco encourages Ellie to reach out to her family, but she lashes out and leaves to reconnect with a rehabilitated Craig, who is touring with Fall Out Boy. After spending a romantic day with him, Ellie is surprised to find Craig's girlfriend Yvette waiting at his apartment. Heartbroken and depressed, Ellie begins drinking heavily and nearly drowns herself at Venice Beach. Marco and Craig rescue her and convince her to visit her family in Canada. Ellie kisses Craig just before she says goodbye.

Paige is now a social pariah in Hollywood and will no longer get offers. Desperate to keep her fame, Paige conspires with Hailey to perform a salacious photo op. Marco confronts Paige for her lack of self-respect, causing Paige to slap him. Marco sadly leaves the mansion. Just as Manny and her friends make it to LA, she gets a call from Mewes explaining the movie's cancellation. Upset, they arrive to a local movie premiere, where Paige nearly second guesses the photo op. Manny recognizes Paige, causing the latter to trip and break her leg on the red carpet. Paige does Stüdz and Manny a favor by having them perform outside Mewes' window, guaranteeing them a spot in the musical.

Paige becomes Mewes' assistant, Ellie tearfully reunites with her father, and Manny and Jay promise to stay together after the movie finishes filming.

Cast 

Former Degrassi: The Next Generation co-star, Shenae Grimes and her current series, 90210, are spoken of in dialogue by Hailey Montel (Mary Ashton) at a party, making Grimes the first Degrassi actor to exist within the Degrassi fictional universe independently of her character. Her Degrassi character, Darcy Edwards is neither seen nor referred to in Degrassi Goes Hollywood, and was said to be volunteering in Africa in a previous season. The line of dialogue, "Does 90210 have an After Show?" also refers to the Canadian series The After Show, which is co-hosted by Dan Levy who plays Robbie in the film. Also making an appearance is Romina D'Ugo, who appeared on the first season of So You Think You Can Dance Canada, as well as Janna Polzin, who was runner-up on How Do You Solve a Problem Like Maria? This was done again the following year with Degrassi Takes Manhattan, when The After Show's Jessi Cruickshank mentions Drake.

Stacey Farber earned a Gemini Award nomination for best performance in a children's or youth program or series, as Ellie Nash in "Paradise City (Part Three)". The award was won by Michael Seater (who also appeared in Degrassi Goes Hollywood) for his work on Life with Derek. He would then star beside Farber in 18 to Life.

Production
Filming was split between Toronto, Canada, and Hollywood, California with the majority being the former to keep production cost low. Adamo, Stacey, Lauren, Jake, and Jason all filmed in both locations while everyone else filmed only in Canada. All of the studio scenes were shot in Toronto during Degrassis regular filming schedule while a lot of outdoor Los Angeles was filmed on location in less than a weeks time. Paige's mansion was filmed in both Canada and Los Angeles.

Absences
The following characters do not appear in the movie, but were regular characters on the show during the previous season.
 Sarah Barrable-Tishauer as Liberty Van Zandt
 Stefan Brogren as Archie "Snake" Simpson
 Paula Brancati as Jane Vaughn
 Aislinn Paul as Clare Edwards

Music 

Degrassi Goes Hollywood: Music from the Original Movie is the title of the movie soundtrack released on CD on 4 August 2009, and digital download 25 August 2009. It features songs from little known Canadian artist as well as five original songs performed by cast members Cassie Steele and Jake Epstein. Some of the songs featured on it were previously used in the show, thus making this the eighth season soundtrack as well.

References

External links 
 

2009 television films
2009 films
Canadian drama television films
English-language Canadian films
Degrassi: The Next Generation
Films set in Los Angeles
Hollywood, Los Angeles in fiction
DHX Media films
2000s Canadian films